Daniel Anderson may refer to:

 Daniel Anderson (musician) (born 1986), member of the band Idiot Pilot
 Daniel Anderson (rugby league) (born 1967), Australian rugby league coach
 Daniel P. Anderson, Presiding Judge of the Wisconsin Court of Appeals
 Daniel R. Anderson (born 1944), American psychologist
 Daniel L. Anderson (born 1968), American politician
 Daniel Anderson (poet) (born 1964), American poet and educator

See also 
 Dan Anderson (disambiguation)
 Daniel Andersson (disambiguation)